Immanuel Maurice Wallerstein (September 28, 1930 – August 31, 2019) was an American sociologist and economic historian. He is perhaps best known for his development of the general approach in sociology which led to the emergence of his world-systems approach. He was a Senior Research Scholar at Yale University from 2000 until his death in 2019, and published bimonthly syndicated commentaries through Agence Global on world affairs from October 1998 to July 2019.

He was the 13th president of International Sociological Association (1994–1998).

Personal life and education
His parents, Sara Günsberg (born in 1895) and Menachem Lazar Wallerstein (born in 1890), were Polish Jews from Galicia who moved to Berlin, because of the World War, where they married in 1919. Two years later, Sara gave birth to their first son, Solomon. In 1923, the Wallerstein family emigrated to New York, where Immanuel was born. On the "list of alien passengers for the United States" at the time of his family's emigration, the nationality of his mother and brother was described as Polish.

Having grown up in a politically conscious family, Wallerstein first became interested in world affairs as a teenager. He received all three of his degrees from Columbia University: a BA in 1951, an MA in 1954, and a PhD in 1959, where he completed his dissertation under the supervision of Hans L. Zetterberg and Robert Staughton Lynd. However, throughout his life, Wallerstein also studied at other universities around the world, including Oxford University from 1955 to 1956, Université libre de Bruxelles, Universite Paris 7 Denis Diderot, and Universidad Nacional Autónoma de México.

From 1951 to 1953 Wallerstein served in the U.S. Army. After his discharge, he wrote a master's thesis on McCarthyism as a phenomenon of American political culture. The widely cited work, as Wallerstein himself later stated, "confirmed my sense that I should consider myself, in the language of the 1950s, a 'political sociologist.

Wallerstein married Beatrice Friedman in 1964, and had a daughter, Katharine, two years later. He was stepfather to Beatrice's two children from a previous marriage. He and Beatrice had five grandchildren.

Academic career
Wallerstein's academic and professional career began at Columbia University where he was first an instructor and then associate professor of sociology from 1958 to 1971. During his time there he became leading supporter for students who were protesting  during the Columbia University protests of 1968 as they fought against Columbia's involvement in the Vietnam War. In 1971 he moved from New York to Montreal, where he taught at McGill University for five years.

Originally, Wallerstein's prime area of intellectual concern was not American politics, but the politics of the non-European world, most especially of India and Africa. For two decades Wallerstein researched Africa, publishing numerous books and articles, and in 1973 he became president of the African Studies Association.

In 1976 Wallerstein was offered the unique opportunity to pursue a new avenue of research, and so became head of the Fernand Braudel Center for the Study of Economies, Historical Systems and Civilization at Binghamton University in New York, whose mission was "to engage in the analysis of large-scale social change over long periods of historical time". The Center opened with the publishing support of a new journal, Review, (of which Wallerstein was the founding editor), and would go on to produce a body of work that "went a long way toward invigorating sociology and its sister disciplines, especially history and political-economy". Wallerstein would serve as a distinguished professor of sociology at Binghamton until his retirement in 1999.

During his career Wallerstein held visiting-professor posts in Hong Kong, British Columbia, and Amsterdam, among numerous others. He was awarded multiple honorary titles, intermittently served as Directeur d'études associé at the École des Hautes Études en Sciences Sociales in Paris, and served as president of the International Sociological Association between 1994 and 1998. Similarly, during the 1990s he chaired the  Gulbenkian Commission on the Restructuring of the Social Sciences, whose object was to indicate a direction for social scientific inquiry for the next 50 years.

Between 2000 and his death in 2019 Wallerstein worked as a Senior Research Scholar at Yale University. He was also a member of the Advisory Editors Council of the Social Evolution & History journal. In 2003, he received the "Career of Distinguished Scholarship Award" from the American Sociological Association, and in 2004 the International N. D. Kondratieff Foundation and the Russian Academy of Natural Sciences (RAEN) awarded him the Gold Kondratieff Medal. Wallerstein died on August 31, 2019 from an infection, at the age of 88.

Theory
Wallerstein began as an expert on post-colonial African affairs, which he selected as the focus of his studies after attending international youth conferences in 1951 and 1952. His publications focused almost exclusively on this topic until the early 1970s, when he began to distinguish himself as a historian and theorist of the global capitalist economy on a macroscopic level. His early criticism of global capitalism and championship of "anti-systemic movements" made him an éminence grise with the anti-globalization movement within and outside of the academic community, along with Noam Chomsky (1928- ) and Pierre Bourdieu (1930-2002).

Wallerstein's most important work, The Modern World-System, appeared in four volumes between 1974 and 2011. In it, Wallerstein drew on several intellectual influences. From Karl Marx, Wallerstein took the underlying emphasis on economic factors and their dominance over ideological factors in global politics, and such ideas as the dichotomy between capital and labor, while criticizing the traditional Marxian view of world economic development through stages such as feudalism and capitalism, and while criticizing as well its account of the process of accumulation of capital, and of dialectics. From dependency theory, he took the key concepts of "core" and "periphery".

However, Wallerstein named Frantz Fanon (1925-1961), Fernand Braudel (1902-1985), and Ilya Prigogine (1917-2003) as the three individuals who exerted the greatest influence "in modifying my line of argument (as opposed to deepening a parallel line of argument)." In The Essential Wallerstein, he stated that: "Fanon represented for me the expression of the insistence by those disenfranchised by the modern world‑system that they have a voice, a vision, and a claim not merely to justice but to intellectual valuation."; that Braudel, for his description of the development and political implications of extensive networks of economic exchange in the European world between 1400 and 1800, "more than anyone else made me conscious of the central importance of the social construction of time and space and its impact on our analyses."; and that "Prigogine forced me to face the implications of a world in which certainties did not exist – but knowledge still did."

Wallerstein also stated that another major influence on his work was the "world revolution" of 1968. A member of the faculty of Columbia University at the time of the student protests, he participated in a faculty committee that attempted to resolve the dispute. He argued in several works that this revolution marked the end of "liberalism" as a viable ideology in the modern world system. He also argued that the end of the Cold War, rather than marking a triumph for liberalism, indicates that the current system has entered its 'end' phase: a period of crisis that will end only when it is replaced by another system. Wallerstein anticipated the growing importance of the North–South divide at a time when the main world conflict was the Cold War.

Wallerstein was often mocked for arguing since 1980 that the United States is a "hegemon in decline", but since the Iraq War this argument has become more widespread. During this time, Wallerstein also argued that the development of the capitalist world economy was detrimental to a large proportion of the world's population. Like Marx, Wallerstein predicted that capitalism will be replaced by a socialist economy, a view held in the 1970s, but reassessed in the 1980s. He concluded that the successor system(s) is unknowable.

Wallerstein both participated in and wrote about the World Social Forum.

The Modern World-System

Wallerstein's first volume on world-systems theory (The Modern World System, 1974) was predominantly written during a year at the Center for Advanced Study in the Behavioral Sciences (now affiliated with Stanford University). In it, he argues that the modern world system is distinguished from empires by its reliance on economic control of the world order by a dominating capitalist center (core) in systemic economic and political relation to peripheral and semi-peripheral world areas.

Wallerstein rejected the notion of a "Third World", claiming that there is only one world connected by a complex network of economic exchange relationships — i.e., a "world-economy" or "world-system" in which the "dichotomy of capital and labor" and the endless "accumulation of capital" by competing agents (historically including, but not limited, to nation-states) account for frictions. This approach is known as the world-system theory.

Wallerstein located the origin of the modern world-system in 16th-century Western Europe and the Americas. An initially slight advance in capital accumulation in Britain, the Dutch Republic, and France, due to specific political circumstances at the end of the period of feudalism, set in motion a process of gradual expansion. As a result, only one global network or system of economic exchange exists in modern society. By the 19th century, virtually every area on earth was incorporated into the capitalist world-economy.

The capitalist world-system is far from homogeneous in cultural, political, and economic terms; instead, it is characterized by fundamental differences in social development, accumulation of political power, and capital. Contrary to affirmative theories of modernization and capitalism, Wallerstein did not conceive of these differences as mere residues or irregularities that can and will be overcome as the system evolves.

A lasting division of the world into core, semi-periphery, and periphery is an inherent feature of world-system theory. Other theories, partially drawn on by Wallerstein, leave out the semi-periphery and do not allow for a grayscale of development. Areas which have so far remained outside the reach of the world-system enter it at the stage of "periphery". There is a fundamental and institutionally stabilized "division of labor" between core and periphery: while the core has a high level of technological development and manufactures complex products, the role of the periphery is to supply raw materials, agricultural products, and cheap labor for the expanding agents of the core. Economic exchange between core and periphery takes place on unequal terms: the periphery is forced to sell its products at low prices, but has to buy the core's products at comparatively high prices. Once established, this unequal state tends to stabilize itself due to inherent, quasi-deterministic constraints. The statuses of core and periphery are not exclusive and fixed geographically, but are relative to each other. A zone defined as "semi-periphery" acts as a periphery to the core and as a core to the periphery. At the end of the 20th century, this zone would comprise Eastern Europe, China, Brazil, and Mexico. It is important to note that core and peripheral zones can co-exist in the same location.

One effect of the expansion of the world-system is the commodification of things, including human labor. Natural resources, land, labor, and human relationships are gradually being stripped of their "intrinsic" value and turned into commodities in a market which determines their exchange value.

In the last two decades of his life, Wallerstein increasingly focused on the intellectual foundations of the modern world-system and the pursuit of universal theories of human behavior. In addition, he showed interest in the "structures of knowledge" defined by the disciplinary division between sociology, anthropology, political science, economics, and the humanities, which he himself regarded as Eurocentric. In analyzing them, he was highly influenced by the "new sciences" of theorists like Ilya Prigogine.

Criticism
Wallerstein's theory provoked harsh criticism, not only from neo-liberal or conservative circles but even from some historians who say that some of his assertions may be historically incorrect. Some critics suggest that Wallerstein tended to neglect the cultural dimension of the modern world-system, arguing that there is a world system of global culture which is independent from the economic processes of capitalism; this reduces it to what some call "official" ideologies of states which can then easily be revealed as mere agencies of economic interest. Nevertheless, his analytical approach, along with that of associated theorists such as Andre Gunder Frank, Terence Hopkins, Samir Amin, Christopher Chase-Dunn, Thomas D. Hall, Anibal Quijano and Giovanni Arrighi, has made a significant impact on the field and has established an institutional base devoted to the general approach of intellectual inquiry. Their ideology has also attracted strong interest from the anti-globalization movement.

Arthur Stinchcombe was very critical of Wallerstein's The Modern World-System, writing that the book presents no theoretical argument and no determinate mechanisms. Instead, the theory of the book "reduces to a general imperative for the scholar to look for world system influences, perhaps wise advice but not very specific." Stinchcombe also argues that the book does not define its concepts independently of their effects, thus entailing tautologies regarding cores, peripheries and semi-peripheries.

Terms and definitions

Capitalist world-system
Wallerstein's definition follows dependency theory, which intended to combine the developments of the different societies since the 16th century in different regions into one collective development. The main characteristic of his definition is the development of a global division of labour, including the existence of independent political units (in this case, states) at the same time. There is no political center, compared to global empires like the Roman Empire; instead, the capitalist world-system is identified by the global market economy. It is divided into core, semi-periphery, and periphery regions, and is ruled by the capitalist mode of production.

Core/periphery
Defines the difference between developed and developing countries, characterized e.g. by power or wealth. The core refers to developed countries, the periphery to the dependent developing countries. The main reason for the position of the developed countries is economic power. Wallerstein "used the term core to suggest a multicentric region containing a group of states rather than the term center , which implies a hierarchy with a single peak."

Semi-periphery
Defines states that are located between core and periphery, and who benefit from the periphery through unequal exchange relations. At the same time, the core benefits from the semi-periphery through unequal exchange relations.

Quasi-monopolies
Defines a kind of monopoly where there is more than one service provider for a particular good/service. Wallerstein claims that quasi-monopolies are self-liquidating because new sellers go into the market by exerting political pressure to open markets to competition.

Kondratiev waves
A Kondratiev wave is defined as a cyclical tendency in the world's economy. It is also known as a supercycle. Wallerstein argues that global wars are tied to Kondratiev waves. According to him, global conflicts occur as the summer phase of a wave begins, which is when production of goods and services around the world are on an upswing.

Honors and fellowships
International Sociological Association Award for Excellence in Research and Practice, 2014
N.D. Kondratieff Gold Medal, Russian Academy of Natural Sciences, 2005
Distinguished Fellow, St. John's College, University of British Columbia, 2004–present
Centro de Estudios, Información y Documentación Immanuel Wallerstein, Univ. de la Tierra-Chiapas y el CIDECI Las Casas, 2004–present
Career of Distinguished Scholarship Award, American Sociological Association, 2003
Career of Distinguished Scholarship Award, Political Economy of the World-System Section of American Sociological Association, 2003
Premio Carlos Marx 2003, Fondo Cultural Tercer Mundo, Mexico
Leerstoel (Chair) Immanuel Wallerstein, University of Ghent, 2002– [Inaugural Lecture by IW on Mar. 11, 2002]
Fellow, The American Academy of Arts and Sciences, 1998
IPE Distinguished Scholar, International Studies Association, 1998
Gulbenkian Professor of Science and Technology, 1994
Medal of the University, University of Helsinki, 1992
Wei Lun Visiting Professor, Chinese University of Hong Kong, 1991
University Award for Excellence in Scholarship, Binghamton University, 1991
George A. Miller Visiting Professor, University of Illinois-Urbana, 1989
Officier, Ordre des Arts et des Lettres, France, 1984
Sorokin Prize (for Distinguished Scholarship), American Sociological Association, 1975
Fellow, Center for Advanced Study in the Behavioral Sciences, Stanford, 1970–71
Ford Fellow in Economics, Political Science and Sociology, 1970–71
Foreign Area Fellowship, Africa, 1955–57
Phi Beta Kappa, 1951

Works

See also
Historical sociology
Late capitalism

References

Further reading
Kenneth, A. "Contemporary social and sociological theory: visualizing social worlds". Thousand Oaks, CA: Pine Forge Press, 2006.
Brewer, A., Marxist Theories of Imperialism: A Critical survey, London: Macmillan, 1990. 
 
Frank, A.G. and B. Gills (eds), The World System: 500 years or 5000?, London: Routledge, 1993. 
Hout, W., Capitalism and the Third World: Development, dependence and the world system, Hants: Edward Elgar, 1993. 
Sanderson, S., Civilizations and World Systems, London: Sage, 1955.
Shannon, T., An Introduction to the World-System Perspective, Oxford: Westview Press, 1989.
Wallerstein, I., The Modern World System: Capitalist Agriculture and the Origins of the European World Economy in the Sixteenth Century, New York: Academic Press, 1974.

External links

Immanuel Wallerstein's Official Website
Immanuel Wallerstein's profile at Yale.edu
Immanuel Wallerstein's Full CV
Wallerstein's Own Fortnightly Commentaries on Current Events 
Articles at Monthly Review
Wallerstein's World-Systems Theory
Presentation of Immanuel Wallerstein's "World-System Model"
"Modern History Sourcebook: Summary of Wallerstein on World System Theory" – Fordham University
Introduction to Social Macrodynamics: Compact Macromodels of the World System Growth by Andrey Korotayev, Artemy Malkov, and Daria Khaltourina
Binghmaton University Fernand Braudel Center for the Study of Economies, Historical Systems, and Civilizations
Journal of World-Systems Research
 "World-Economic Theories and Problems: Quigley vs. Wallerstein vs Central Civilization" by David Wilkinson
Entering Global Anarchy by Immanuel Wallerstein
Interview with Wallerstein (2008) on the End of Capitalism and World-Systems
 Reading Fanon in the 21st Century – 2009, New Left Review essay
 Structural Crisis – 2010, New Left Review essay
 The Immanuel Wallerstein Collection Finding Aid, Binghamton University Libraries

Video
"The U.S. As a World Power" C-SPAN (2002)
"The United States Facing Its Decline" – Fall 2006, Conference given by Immanuel Wallerstein at the Université de Montréal (in French)
 – Immanuel Wallerstein comments on America's recent financial crisis in TV interview

Audio
Grace Lee Boggs and Immanuel Wallerstein Dialogue – U.S. Social Forum, 2010
"Global Africa: Liberation Movements Since 1945" – Sept. 24, 2008, dialogue between Immanuel Wallerstein, Walter Turner, and Will Grant at CounterPULSE, part of the ongoing Shaping San Francisco Talks series
KPFA Radio Interview – Nov. 12, 2008, Immanuel Wallerstein comments on the structural constraints faced by Obama and the current economic crisis

1930 births
2019 deaths
American Africanists
American foreign policy writers
American socialists
American sociologists
American male non-fiction writers
American people of Polish-Jewish descent
American political writers
American social sciences writers
Columbia University faculty
Binghamton University faculty
Columbia College (New York) alumni
Dependency theorists
Geopoliticians
Jewish historians
Imperialism studies
American international relations scholars
Jewish American social scientists
Columbia University alumni
Jewish sociologists
Jewish philosophers
Officiers of the Ordre des Arts et des Lettres
Scientists from New York City
N. D. Kondratieff Medal laureates
Theoretical historians
World system scholars
Writers about globalization
Writers from New York City
Presidents of the International Sociological Association
Presidents of the African Studies Association